Lindsay Bowne is an Australian former professional rugby league footballer who played for Cronulla-Sutherland.

Bowne came to Cronulla via Grafton, having been a NSW Country Firsts representative player.

Playing as a center and winger, Bowne featured in first-grade at Cronulla for two seasons. He was Cronulla's leading try-scorer in the 1992 NSWRL season, with a total of nine tries.

As of 2018 he is the track manager at Tamworth Jockey Club.

References

External links
Lindsay Bowne at Rugby League project

Year of birth missing (living people)
Living people
Australian rugby league players
Cronulla-Sutherland Sharks players
Rugby league players from New South Wales
Country New South Wales rugby league team players
Rugby league centres
Rugby league wingers